Samuele Cerro (born 21 March 1995) is an Italian triple jumper.

Biography
Cerro was a finalist at the 2017 European Athletics U23 Championships. In July 2019, he was a finalist at the Summer Universiade and then he won the national title at the Italian Championships in Brixen.

Personal best
Triple jump: 16.59 m (Agropoli, june 2019)

National titles
 Italian Athletics Championships
 Triple jump: 2019

See also
 Italy at the 2019 Summer Universiade

References

External links
 
 
 Samuele Cerro at FIDAL 

1995 births
Living people
Italian male triple jumpers
Italian Athletics Championships winners
Competitors at the 2019 Summer Universiade